Darin Michael "Dody" Wood (born March 18, 1972) is a Canadian former professional ice hockey left winger drafted by the San Jose Sharks in the third round, 45th overall, in the 1991 NHL Entry Draft. He dressed for 106 NHL games with the San Jose Sharks before being traded to the New Jersey Devils on December 7, 1997. He was later assigned to the Albany River Rats for the remainder of the 97-98 season. In September 2000, he signed as a free agent with the Vancouver Canucks.

Wood also played with the IHL's Kansas City Blades, where he was voted most popular player two times as well as winning community service awards.  He wore number 16 in his first stint with the team (1992–1995), and 13 when he returned (1998) because someone else already had 16, but returned to 16 later on. He also suited up for a few games with the Memphis RiverKings of the CHL as well as the Dayton Bombers in the 2003-2004 season.

In his time with San Jose,  Wood went toe-to-toe with popular enforcer Tie Domi. The fight occurred in Domi's final season with the Winnipeg Jets. Wood was considered a strong opponent against  Domi. In fact, the brawl between the two was one of the few fights Domi had lost. Wood was considered an enforcer as well. He participated in several fights throughout his professional career, these include fights with: Jim Paek (1993), Donald Brashear (1997), and Scott Walker (1997).

Wood continued his hockey career after the NHL by playing for a senior league, the Horse Lake Thunder of the North Peace Hockey League and eventually playing for the Allan Cup. The league included many players that played with Wood in his NHL career including former Vancouver Canuck and Montreal Canadien Gino Odjick, former Calgary Flames fighter Sasha Lakovic and his brother Greg Lakovic, and Theo Fleury's cousin Todd Holt. Here, Dody Wood was referred to as the "former San Jose tough guy". Several articles note the irony of "Odjick, Lakovic and Wood banding together in a league with the word peace in its title".

Personal
Wood learned to skate at the age of five, after his parents enrolled him in the Little Giant Figure Skating Club. A year later, Wood was enrolled into Chetwynd's Minor Hockey Association.

Wood has three children: a son Bayley (1997) from his previous marriage as well as twin daughters Zarah and Zinia (2007) from his second marriage.

Wood coached the CDMHA's Midget Giants in the 2012-2013 season. Wood stated he was volunteering for the "very association that taught him the 'love of the game'".

Wood is from Chetwynd, British Columbia, and is of Saulteau First Nations ancestry.

Career statistics

References

External links

1972 births
Living people
Albany River Rats players
Ayr Scottish Eagles players
Canadian ice hockey left wingers
Dayton Bombers players
Ice hockey people from British Columbia
Ice Hockey Superleague players
Kansas City Blades players
Memphis RiverKings players
Nottingham Panthers players
People from the Peace River Regional District
Saint-Georges Cool FM 103.5 players
San Jose Sharks draft picks
San Jose Sharks players
Seattle Thunderbirds players
Swift Current Broncos players
First Nations sportspeople
Canadian expatriate ice hockey players in England
Canadian expatriate ice hockey players in Scotland
Canadian expatriate ice hockey players in the United States